Kłoda may refer to the following places in Poland:
Kłoda, Lower Silesian Voivodeship (south-west Poland)
Kłoda, Lublin Voivodeship (east Poland)
Kłoda, Świętokrzyskie Voivodeship (south-central Poland)
Kłoda, Masovian Voivodeship (east-central Poland)
Kłoda, Leszno County in Greater Poland Voivodeship (west-central Poland)
Kłoda, Piła County in Greater Poland Voivodeship (west-central Poland)